Waireia is a genus of flowering plants belonging to the family Orchidaceae.

Its native range is New Zealand.

Species:
 Waireia stenopetala (Hook.f.) D.L.Jones, M.A.Clem. & Molloy

References

Diurideae
Diurideae genera